Sanda Malešević (born 22 April 1994) is a Serbian footballer who plays as a midfielder and has appeared for the Serbia women's national team.

Career
Malešević has been capped for the Serbia national team, appearing for the team during the 2019 FIFA Women's World Cup qualifying cycle.

References

External links
 
 
 

1994 births
Living people
Sportspeople from Knin
Serbian women's footballers
Serbia women's international footballers
Women's association football midfielders
ŽFK Spartak Subotica players
ŽFK Sloga Zemun players
People from the Republic of Serbian Krajina